Mørch is a Norwegian or Danish surname. The name may refer to:
 Claus Mørch (disambiguation)
 Olaf Mørch Hansson (1856-1912), Norwegian actor
 Ole Mørk (born 1948), sometimes known as Ole Mørch, Danish football manager
 Ole Clausen Mørch (1774-1829), Norwegian politician
 Otto Andreas Lowson Mörch (1828-1878), also spelled Mørch, malacologist
 Petter Mørch Koren (1910-2004), Norwegian politician